Telenet was an American commercial packet-switched network which went into service in 1975. It was the first FCC-licensed public data network in the United States. Various commercial and government interests paid monthly fees for dedicated lines connecting their computers and local networks to this backbone network. Free public dialup access to Telenet, for those who wished to access these systems, was provided in hundreds of cities throughout the United States.

The original founding company, Telenet Inc., was established by  Bolt Beranek and Newman (BBN) and recruited Larry Roberts (former head of the ARPANet) as President of the company, and Barry Wessler.  GTE acquired Telenet in 1979. It was later acquired by Sprint and called "Sprintnet".  Sprint migrated customers from Telenet to the modern-day Sprintlink IP network, one of many networks composing today's Internet.

Telenet had its first offices in downtown Washington, D.C., then moved to McLean, Virginia. It was acquired by GTE while in McLean, and then moved to offices in Reston, Virginia.

History
After establishing "value added carriers" was legalized in the U.S., Bolt Beranek and Newman (BBN) who were the private contractors for ARPANET set out to create a private sector version. In January 1975, Telenet Communications Corporation announced that they had acquired the necessary venture capital after a two-year quest, and on August 16 of the same year they began operating the first public packet-switching network.

Coverage 

Originally, the public network had switching nodes in seven US cities:
Washington, D.C. (network operations center as well as switching)
Boston, Massachusetts
New York, New York
Chicago, Illinois
Dallas, Texas
San Francisco, California
Los Angeles, California

The switching nodes were fed by Telenet Access Controller (TAC) terminal concentrators both colocated and remote from the switches. By 1980, there were over 1000 switches in the public network. At that time, the next largest network using Telenet switches was that of Southern Bell, which had approximately 250 switches.

In 1977, Telenet added a London node and a Network Control Centre in a London building of Britain's Post Office Telecommunications.

Internal network technology 

The initial network used statically-defined hop-by-hop routing, using Prime commercial minicomputers as switches, but then migrated to a purpose-built multiprocessing switch based on 6502 microprocessors.  Among the innovations of this second-generation switch was a patented arbitrated bus interface that created a switched fabric among the microprocessors.  By contrast, a typical microprocessor-based system of the time used a bus; switched fabrics did not become common until about twenty years later, with the advent of PCI Express and HyperTransport.

Most interswitch lines ran at 56 kbit/s, with a few, such as New York-Washington, at T1 (i.e., 1.544 Mbit/s). The main internal protocol was a proprietary variant on X.75; Telenet also ran standard X.75 gateways to other packet switching networks.

Originally, the switching tables could not be altered separately from the main executable code, and topology updates had to be made by deliberately crashing the switch code and forcing a reboot from the network management center. Improvements in the software allowed new tables to be loaded, but the network never used dynamic routing protocols. Multiple static routes, on a switch-by-switch basis, could be defined for fault tolerance. Network management functions continued to run on Prime minicomputers.

Telenet initially used a proprietary virtual connection host interface. Roberts and Barry Wessler joined the international effort to standardize the a protocol for packet-switched data communication based on virtual circuits shortly before it was finalized. The  CCITT proposal for X.25 was being prepared by Rémi Després and other international experts. A few minor changes, which complemented the proposed specification, were accommodated to enable Telenet to join the agreement. Telenet adopted X.25 shortly after the protocol was published in March 1976. Its X.25 host interface was the first in the industry.

Accessing the network

Basic asynchronous access

Users could use modems on the Public Switched Telephone Network to dial TAC ports, calling either from "dumb" terminals or from computers emulating such terminals. Organizations with a large number of local terminals could install a TAC on their own site, which used a dedicated line, at up to 56 kbit/s, to connect to a switch at the nearest Telenet location. Dialup modems supported had a maximum speed of 1200 bit/s, and later 4800 bit/s.

For example, a customer in NYC could dial into the local number, then type in a command similar to:

which would connect (that "c") them to a computer system designated as number "555" located in the same vicinity as the standard telephone "area code" 301.

One significant customer was an early (what would now be called) internet service provider The Source which had their equipment in Mclean, Va. Telenet offered a much lower nighttime rate when there were few corporate customers, and this let The Source set up a modestly priced offering to tens of thousands of customers. Another prominent customer in the 1980s was Quantum Link (now AOL).

Other access protocols

Telenet supported remote concentrators for IBM 3270 family intelligent terminals, which communicated, via X.25 to Telenet-written software that ran in IBM 370x series front-end processors. Telenet also supported Block Mode Terminal Interfaces (BMTI) for IBM Remote Job Entry terminals supporting the 2780/3780 and HASP Bisync protocols.

PC Pursuit

In the late 1980s, Telenet offered a service called PC Pursuit. For a flat monthly fee, customers could dial into the Telenet network in one city, then dial out on the modems in another city to access bulletin board systems and other services. PC Pursuit was popular among computer hobbyists because it sidestepped long-distance charges. In this sense, PC Pursuit was similar to the Internet, allowing any user to call any system as if it were local.

On connection to the network, the user entered a 5-letter code for the target city they wished to call. This consisted of a 2-letter state code and a 3-letter acronym for the city. For instance, to call a system in Cleveland, Ohio, the user would enter the code OHCLV, for "OHio", "CLeVeland". Once connected, the user could dial out to any local number, and the system simulated a direct connection between the two endpoints.

Notes

See also
 International Packet Switched Service
Tymnet

References

1974 establishments in Washington, D.C.
American companies established in 1974
Companies based in McLean, Virginia
Companies based in Reston, Virginia
Companies based in Washington, D.C.
Computer companies established in 1974
Computer networks
Computer-related introductions in 1974
History of telecommunications
Pre–World Wide Web online services
Telecommunications-related introductions in 1974
X.25